William Henry Mills Jr. (November 2, 1919 – August 9, 2019), also known as "Buster", was a catcher who played in Major League Baseball during the  season. Born in Boston, Massachusetts, Mills was one of many ballplayers who appeared in the major leagues only during the World War II years.

Early life
Mills started with the Philadelphia Athletics in 1944 as an unsigned free agent out of Holy Cross, where he was a member of the football and baseball squads from 1939 through 1943. In his senior season, Mills served as the captain of the Crusaders baseball team and won the batting title of the league with a .586 average. He was nicknamed Buster after Colonel Buster Mills, who spent nine seasons in the major leagues as a player or manager.

Career 
Mills, who had been rejected by the military draft because of a perforated ear drum, started his professional baseball career in 1944 with the Lancaster Red Roses of the Interstate League, but was promoted to the Athletics in the month of June as the draft was depleting major league rosters of first-line players. He was used primarily as a pinch-hitter in four games and caught one game, going 1-for-4 for a .250 batting average.

Following his major league stint, Mills played in the minor leagues until 1949. Over a five-year career, he posted a .286 average with 17 home runs in 316 games.

Later life
After retirement, Mills returned to his native Boston and pursued a teaching and coaching career at the high school level.  Mills died on August 9, 2019, just three months before his 100th birthday.

See also
1944 Philadelphia Athletics season

References

External links

Major League Baseball catchers
Philadelphia Athletics players
Lancaster Red Roses players
Providence Chiefs players
Providence Grays players
Toronto Maple Leafs (International League) players
Holy Cross Crusaders baseball players
Baseball players from Boston
1919 births
2019 deaths